Budni may refer to:

 Budhni, a town in India
 Budhni railway station
 Budnikowsky, a German drugstore chain